Dr Douglas Walatara (23 October 1920 - 2 February 2011) was a notable Sri Lankan lecturer in English and had a number of well known published materials. Some of his works have received coverage outside Sri Lanka and some of his books are available through libraries across the globe, such as the Australian National Library.

Dr Walatara became well known for the "Reconstruction Method" which was a bilingual method that used the student's mother tongue to teach the English language. Some have claimed that this was designed mainly for the benefit of rural children who had difficulty learning English under teachers who themselves “learnt English as a foreign language and for whom English was entirely foreign”.

Early years 

Douglas Walatara was the eldest of three brothers born to an Anglo-Indian mother from Goa, India, and a Sinhalese father from Colombo, Sri Lanka. He attended S. Thomas' College, Mount Lavinia where he excelled in English studies. In the very early 1960s, Walatara lived in England for a year before returning to Sri Lanka.

English Profession 
A popular Sri Lankan Newspaper, the Sunday Times, describes Dr Walatara as having performed with much distinction, the task of educating teachers in the South Asian country. In fact, Dr Walatara led a group of educationists who wanted to teach English through the Sinhala language. This group of educationists included Jeanne Hoban (also known as Jeanne Moonesinghe) among others.

Dr Walarara initially taught at the Sri Lankan Government Training College in Maharagama for over 20 years. Following this, he was a Professor of Education at the University of Colombo, Sri Lanka.

It has been claimed that he renounced a prestigious position as an executive in the Bank of Ceylon to take up a role as a lower paid but more fulfilling, job as a teacher-educator.

References

External links 
 http://catalogue.nla.gov.au/Search/Home?lookfor=author:%22Walatara%2C%20D%22&iknowwhatimean=1

Sri Lankan educational theorists
Academic staff of the University of Colombo
Sri Lankan people of Indian descent
1920 births
2011 deaths